Glutathione S-transferase Mu 1 (gene name GSTM1) is a human glutathione S-transferase.

Function 

Cytosolic and membrane-bound forms of glutathione S-transferase are encoded by two distinct supergene families. At present, eight distinct classes of the soluble cytoplasmic mammalian glutathione S-transferases have been identified: alpha, kappa, mu, omega, pi, sigma, theta and zeta. This gene encodes a cytoplasmic glutathione S-transferase that belongs to the mu class. The mu class of enzymes functions in the detoxification of electrophilic compounds, including carcinogens, therapeutic drugs, environmental toxins, and products of oxidative stress, by conjugation with glutathione.

The genes encoding the mu class of enzymes are organized in a gene cluster on chromosome 1p13.3, and are known to be highly polymorphic. These genetic variations can change an individual's susceptibility to carcinogens and toxins, as well as affect the toxicity and efficacy of certain drugs. Null mutations of this class mu gene have been linked with an increase in a number of cancers, likely due to an increased susceptibility to environmental toxins and carcinogens. Multiple protein isoforms are encoded by transcript variants of this gene.

See also 
 Biliary atresia

References

Further reading

External links 
 PDBe-KB provides an overview of all the structure information available in the PDB for Human Glutathione S-transferase Mu 1